Yale vs. Harvard is a 1927 Our Gang short silent comedy film directed by Robert F. McGowan. It was the 64th Our Gang short that was released and is considered to have been lost in the 1965 MGM vault fire.

Cast

The Gang
 Joe Cobb as Joe
 Jackie Condon as Jackie
 Jean Darling as Jean
 Allen Hoskins as Farina
 Jannie Hoskins as Mango
 Bobby Hutchins as Wheezer
 Jay R. Smith as Jay
 Harry Spear as Harry
 Johnny Aber as Our Gang member
 Paul Toien as Our Gang member
 Pete the Pup as himself

Additional cast
 Godfrey "Duffy" Craig as Rival Gang member
 Robert Parrish as Rival Gang member
 Carl Busch as Undetermined role
 Robert Cruzon as Undetermined role
 Martha Sleeper as Undetermined role

See also
 Our Gang filmography

References

External links

1927 films
1927 comedy films
1927 short films
1927 lost films
American silent short films
American black-and-white films
Films directed by Robert F. McGowan
Lost American films
Lost comedy films
Metro-Goldwyn-Mayer short films
Our Gang films
Silent American comedy films
1920s American films
1920s English-language films